is the 13th single by Japanese singer Yōko Oginome. Written by Masao Urino and Kyōhei Tsutsumi, the single was released on October 27, 1987, by Victor Entertainment.

Background and release
The song was used as the theme song of the TBS drama special , which also starred Oginome.

"Kitakaze no Carol" peaked at No. 2 on Oricon's singles chart and also sold over 117,000 copies.

In 1991, Oginome re-recorded the song in a Christmas style, titled ; this version was released in the remix album New Take: Best Collections '92.

Track listing
All lyrics are written by Masao Urino; all music is composed by Kyōhei Tsutsumi; all music is arranged by Hiroshi Shinkawa.

Charts

References

External links

1987 singles
Yōko Oginome songs
Japanese-language songs
Japanese television drama theme songs
Songs with lyrics by Masao Urino
Songs with music by Kyōhei Tsutsumi
Victor Entertainment singles